Events from the year 1915 in Vietnam

Incumbents  
 Monarch: Duy Tân

Events 

 Construction of the Nguyễn Thị Minh Khai High School was completed.

Births 

 May 1 – Hoàng Văn Thái in Tiền Hải
 August 1 – Bà Tùng Long in Da Nang
 December 20 – Tú Duyên in Bát Tràng
 Nam Cao in the Hà Nam Province
 Nguyễn Văn Linh
 Nguyễn Văn Hinh in Mỹ Tho

References